NA-240 Karachi South-I is a constituency for the National Assembly of Pakistan that encompasses Lyari.

Members of Parliament

2018-2023: NA-246 Karachi South-I

Election 2002 

General elections were held on 10 Oct 2002. Nabeel Gabol of PPP won by 32,424 votes.

Election 2008 

General elections were held on 18 Feb 2008. Nabeel Gabol of PPP won by 84,217 votes.

Election 2013 

General elections were held on 11 May 2013. Shahjahan Baloch of PPP won by 84,530 votes and became the member of National Assembly.

Election 2018 

General elections were held on 25 July 2018.

PPP lost its stronghold of layari with result PTI gaining this seat.

See also
NA-239 Karachi East-IV
NA-241 Karachi South-II

References

External links 
Election result's official website

NA-248
Karachi